Malik Miran Bakhsh (20 April 1907 – 8 February 1991) was a Pakistani international cricketer who played in two Test matches in 1955. Known throughout his playing career as Miran Bux, he was aged 47 years and 284 days when he played his first Test (against India at Lahore), making him the second oldest Test debutant, behind James Southerton. Unusually, this was only his second first-class cricket match.

A tall off-spinner, he had taken five wickets in a two-day match against the touring West Indians in 1948/49, and 10 in another two-day match against the Commonwealth XI in 1949/50. After his brief Test career ended, he continued playing first-class cricket in Pakistan until the 1958/59, when at the age of 51, he took four wickets in his last match playing for Rawalpindi against Peshawar. His best bowling figures came in a match for Combined Services at Dacca in 1956/57, when he took 6 for 15 to help dismiss East Pakistan Whites for 33 runs.

References

External links
 

1907 births
1991 deaths
Pakistan Test cricketers
Pakistani cricketers
Combined Services (Pakistan) cricketers
Rawalpindi cricketers
Cricketers from Rawalpindi